In mathematics, the Fourier transform on finite groups is a generalization of the discrete Fourier transform from cyclic to arbitrary finite groups.

Definitions

Properties

Transform of a convolution
The convolution of two functions  is defined as

Plancherel formula
For functions , the Plancherel formula states

Fourier transform for finite abelian groups
If the group G is a finite abelian group, the situation simplifies considerably:

 all irreducible representations  are of degree 1 and hence equal to the irreducible characters of the group. Thus the matrix-valued Fourier transform becomes scalar-valued in this case.

This group is known as the Pontryagin dual of G.

The Fourier transform of a function  is the function  given by

The inverse Fourier transform is then given by

For , a choice of a primitive n-th root of unity  yields an isomorphism

However, such an isomorphism is not canonical, similarly to the situation that a finite-dimensional vector space is isomorphic to its dual, but giving an isomorphism requires choosing a basis.

Fourier Transform can also be done on cosets of a group.

Relationship with representation theory
There is a direct relationship between the Fourier transform on finite groups and the representation theory of finite groups. Modules of this ring are the same thing as representations. Maschke's theorem implies that  is a semisimple ring, so by the Artin–Wedderburn theorem it decomposes as a direct product of matrix rings. The Fourier transform on finite groups explicitly exhibits this decomposition, with a matrix ring of dimension  for each irreducible representation.
More specifically, the Peter-Weyl theorem (for finite groups) states that there is an isomorphism

given by

The left hand side is the group algebra of G. The direct sum is over a complete set of inequivalent irreducible G-representations .

The Fourier transform for a finite group is just this isomorphism. The product formula mentioned above is equivalent to saying that this map is a ring isomorphism.

Applications

This generalization of the discrete Fourier transform is used in numerical analysis. A circulant matrix is a matrix where every column is a cyclic shift of the previous one. Circulant matrices can be diagonalized quickly using the fast Fourier transform, and this  yields a fast method for solving systems of linear equations with circulant matrices. Similarly, the Fourier transform on arbitrary groups can be used to give fast algorithms for matrices with other symmetries . These algorithms can be used for the construction of numerical methods for solving partial differential equations that preserve the symmetries of the equations .

When applied to the Boolean group , the Fourier transform on this group is the Hadamard transform, which is  commonly used in quantum computing and other fields. Shor's algorithm uses both the Hadamard transform (by applying a Hadamard gate to every qubit) as well as the quantum Fourier transform.

See also
Fourier transform
Least-squares spectral analysis
Representation theory of finite groups
Character theory

References

 .
.
.
 .
.

Fourier analysis
Finite groups